Alex Smith was a 60-year-old African-American man who was lynched in Gulfport, Harrison County, Mississippi by unknown attackers on March 22, 1922. According to the United States Senate Committee on the Judiciary it was the 19th of 61 lynchings during 1922 in the United States.

Background

Alex or Alexander Smith, from the Bayou Bernard bridge area, allegedly ran "a house of ill fame" that was raided early 1922 on the fringes of Gulfport. News reports at the time state that inside, "white girls and young white men" were found. He was released and under bond to appear for his trial.

Lynching

Smith was seized and the coroner's report stated that he “came to his death by strangulation and pistol wounds at the hands of unknown persons” on March 22, 1922. His body was found hanging from a bridge with multiple bullet wounds.    Newspapers at the time stated that the Ku Klux Klan was rumoured to have had a "party" to execute Smith.

See also
Will Bell was lynched on January 29, 1922, in Pontotoc, Mississippi.
Will Thrasher was lynched on February 1, 1922, in Crystal Springs, Mississippi.
William Baker was lynched on March 8, 1922, in Aberdeen, Mississippi.
Robert Collins was lynched on June 20, 1922, Summit, Mississippi.
John Steelman was lynched on August 23, 1922, in Lambert, Mississippi.

Bibliography 
Notes

References

1922 riots
1922 in Mississippi
African-American history of Mississippi
Deaths by person in Mississippi
Lynching deaths in Mississippi
December 1922 events
Protest-related deaths
Racially motivated violence against African Americans
Riots and civil disorder in Mississippi
White American riots in the United States